This page lists all of the numbered county roads in Wellington County, Ontario, Canada.

In the late 1990s, when the provincial government downloaded many portions of Ontario highways to the municipalities, Wellington County became responsible for portions of former highways 9, 23, 24 and 25.  These are now named 109, 123, 124 and 125 respectively.  Currently, five provincial highways run through Wellington County.  These are highways 6, 7, 9, 23, and 89.

Road numbers in Wellington County mainly follow a system in which the numbers correspond to the township in which the road has its county terminus.  Roads 1-6 are in Minto; 7-12 in Mapleton; 14-16 in Wellington North; 17-21 in Centre Wellington; 22-26 in Erin; 27-29 in former Eramosa Township (now a part of Guelph-Eramosa); and 30-41 in former Guelph Township (also now a part of Guelph-Eramosa) and Puslinch, many of which are roads that originate in the City of Guelph.  Highways 86 and 87 are named for the county road of the same name that continue past the boundaries of Waterloo Region and Huron County respectively.  Highway 46 is the former routing of Highway 6 before the highway was rerouted along the Hanlon Parkway.  All other roads were numbered after this system was put into place, and are mostly very short routes connecting villages or other points of interest to the main county road system.

Wellington
Roads in Wellington County, Ontario